Hoàng Anh Attapeu F.C. or HAA is a football club, based in Attapeu, Laos. The club plays its home games at Attapeu Stadium.

The club is owned by Vietnamese  Hoàng Anh Gia Lai Group, who also own's V-League side Hoàng Anh Gia Lai.

Honours

Domestic competitions 
 Lao Premier League 
 Winners (1): 2014

International competitions
Mekong Club Championship
2014: Fourth Place

Players

Continental record

Affiliated clubs
  Hoàng Anh Gia Lai

References

2013 establishments in Laos
Football clubs in Laos
Association football clubs established in 2012